The Ehden massacre took place on 13 June 1978, part of the 1975–1990 Lebanese Civil War. It was an inter-Christian attack that occurred between the Maronite clans. A Phalangist squad attacked the mansion of Frangieh family in an attempt to capture Ehden, killing nearly 40 people including Tony Frangieh, his spouse and his three-year-old daughter, Jihane. After the massacre, the power of the Frangiehs is reported to have declined.

Background
At the initial phase of the Lebanese civil war, more specifically in the summer of 1976, the major Maronite leaders formed the Lebanese Front, institutionalizing their cooperation. However, the relations among the members of the Lebanese Front damaged in May 1978 due to Suleiman Frangieh's pro-Syrian position and his intention to leave the Front. Eventually Frangieh left the alliance later in 1978.

On the other hand, again at the initial stage of the civil war, Frangieh had to call on the Phalange for assistance in the north of Lebanon where before the war the Phalange had not had any power, especially in Zgharta, Frangieh's hometown. Beginning in 1978, the Phalange had become a major force in the region, picking up recruits and threatening Marada's protection rackets, especially around Chekka. Marada was the militia commanded by Suleiman Frengieh's son Tony and the local force of the region.

In 1978 Spring, the Frangieh family asked the Phalange to leave the region. In fact, the Phalange were losing power there. All attempts to reconcile the two groups at Bkerke were unsuccessful. In May 1978, Suleiman Frangieh began not attending the Lebanese Front meetings and instead, developed close relations with the Syrians. The Frangieh family had aligned with Syria through personal relationships between Suleiman Frangieh and the Syrian President Hafez Assad, and between Tony Frangieh and Assad's younger brother Rifaat Assad. Furthermore, the Phalangists were claimed to have wanted the partition of Lebanon, while the Frangiehs to have wished to keep it whole. Therefore, it is argued that the Frangieh-Gemayel rivalry had initially been a purely political feud, and it was the only motive of the massacre.

In addition, another critical event or trigger for the massacre was the assassination of a local Phalange leader and commander, Joud Al Bayeh, by six armed men sent by Tony Frangieh on 8 June 1978. Bayeh had attempted to open an office in Zgharta before he was killed. Bashir Gemayel initially tried to settle the problem through negotiations via Maronite Patriarch Antonios Khreich. But, these negotiations did not become productive. Gemayel then decided to retaliate with a reprisal raid deep into Frangieh's mansion in Ehden. The original plan was to arrest those who had murdered Al Bayeh. It was known that they had been hiding in Frangieh's summer residence in Ehden.

Events
On 13 June 1978 at 4am, hundreds of Bashir Gemayel's Phalangist gunmen attacked the mansion of Frangieh family in Ehden, and murdered Tony Frangieh, his wife Vera Frangieh (née el Kordahi), their three-year-old daughter Jihane, and thirty other Marada bodyguards and aides, who were at the mansion. Tony Frangieh was the eldest son of the former Lebanon President Sulaiman Frangieh and scion of one of the most powerful northern Maronite clans. He was at 36 age when killed.

Those in the mansion refused to surrender and a long gun battle ensued in which Samir Geagea was seriously injured and fell unconscious on the road leading to the compound. The operation was successful from a military standpoint, but when Gemayel's men entered the mansion, they unexpectedly recognised among the dead Tony Frangieh and several members of his family. The Marada members were killed while trying to defend the mansion. "Even the family dog did not escape the carnage of that day." Tony's father Suleiman Frangieh claimed that the Phalangist gunmen forced Tony and his young wife Vera to watch the shooting of their infant daughter Jihane, then made him watch the murder of his wife, before killing him. More than ten phalangist gunmen were also killed in the attack.

Tony Frangieh's son, Suleiman Frangieh Jr., escaped the massacre. He was not with his family in Ehden at that time.

Perpetrators
One of the Phalange forces attacked the mansion was led by then 26-year-old Samir Geagea. Geagea's hometown was traditionally at odds with the Frangiehs. It was further claimed that the other squad was led by Elie Hobeika.

Aftermath
On 14 July 1978, a funeral ceremony was organized for the victims in Zagharta. Syrian troops stormed a village, Deir el Ahmar, nearly 15.5 miles southeast of Ehden to search for the perpetrators on the same day. Marada forces also carried out a series of revenge killings and kidnappings. In the following period the Phalange members in the area were displaced and nearly 100 of them were killed.

Responses to allegations
The Marada Movement, headed by Suleiman Frangieh Jr., accuses the Lebanese Forces of carrying out the Ehden massacre. Bashir Gemayel argued that the massacre was a "social revolt against feudalism." In addition, the Phalangist Party declared that its forces carried out the attack since the Marada forces did not surrender the killers of the Phalangist leader.

Samir Geagea who allegedly headed the Phalangist force responsible for the Ehden massacre admitted that he was among the "military squad" that was in charge of the Ehden "operation", but he denied taking part in the massacre, claiming that he was shot before the incident.

Investigation and arrests
Hanna Shallita was arrested during a 1994 government crackdown on Samir Geagea's Lebanese Forces, who was accused of staging the Ehden massacre. Shallita was set free after paying an LL5 million bail in August 2002. However, no official investigation was ever made to find out who killed the Frangieh family and others, although the file was reopened in 2002. Thus, killers have not been officially identified. On the other hand, when the file was reopened in 2002, Suleiman Frangieh Jr., son of Tony Frangieh, criticised the move, arguing that its aim was to show him manipulation of his slain family's blood for political ends. He further stated "the affair is a bygone for me, buried in the past."

Scholarly views
The travel writer and historian William Dalrymple reaches the conclusion that the Ehden massacre was remarkable and revealed more clearly than anything the medieval feudal reality behind the civilized twentieth-century veneer of Lebanese politics.

Related publications
French journalist, Richard Labeviere published a book entitled The Ehden Massacre. The Curse of Arab Christians (2009). The book provides alleged details of how Samir Geagea, the chief of the Lebanese Forces party, was chosen in 1978 by Mossad to execute the Ehden massacre.

References

External links
Chamussy (René) – Chronique d'une guerre: Le Liban 1975-1977 – éd. Desclée – 1978 (in French)

1978 in Lebanon
Frangieh family
June 1978 events in Asia
Mass murder in 1978
Massacres in 1978
Massacres of the Lebanese Civil War
Zgharta District
1978 murders in Lebanon
Massacres of Christians in Lebanon